Liberty Games is a UK-based retailer, distributor, and designer of games room equipment located in Epsom, England. The company was first founded in 1989 as "Liberty Leisure", renting out equipment to various establishments in England. In 2001, it switched to manufacturing gaming products and changed to its current name after Liberty Leisure was sold. It is now incorporated under the name of Majestic Leisure Ltd.

Their products include arcade games, pool tables, snooker tables, table tennis tables, jukeboxes, pinball machines, retro gaming, air hockey, dartboards, casino tables, outdoor products, driving simulators, slot machines, football tables, and various novelty game products, including multi-game tables, football coffee tables, LED pool tables. They also manufacture retro products, including old-fashioned jukeboxes and old-school arcade machines. Liberty Games products are commonly found in liquor stores, supermarkets, and restaurants around the UK.

Popular Liberty Games products include an Internet meme-themed pinball machine entitled 'Meme Ball' and Frontier Customisable Arcade Machine. The company also holds distribution rights to the  Novotable and  Offside Football Table.

Liberty Games have supplied products to various television shows for use in production, such as Big Brother UK and Saturday Kitchen.

Liberty Games are official sponsors of the British Foosball Association for 2012/2013.

References

External links
 Official website

Companies based in Surrey
Retail companies of the United Kingdom
Epsom
Retail companies established in 1989
1989 establishments in England